Les Louanges is a Canadian indie pop act from Quebec, that consists of Vincent Roberge. His debut album, La nuit est une panthère, was a shortlisted nominee for the 2019 Polaris Music Prize, and won the Juno Award for Francophone Album of the Year at the Juno Awards of 2020.

Originally from Lévis, Roberge released his first EP Le Mercure in 2016. He participated in the Francouvertes competition in 2017, finishing as a top three finalist behind winner Lydia Képinski.

La nuit est une panthère was released in 2018. In addition to his Polaris Prize nomination, he received a SOCAN Songwriting Prize nomination in the French division for his song "Tercel". He won the Prix Félix-Leclerc at the 2019 edition of Les Francos de Montréal, and the Prix Espoir FEQ at the Festival d'été de Québec, and the single "Attends-moi pas" was shortlisted for the 2020 SOCAN Songwriting Prize.

He composed music for Anne Émond's 2019 film Young Juliette (Jeune Juliette).

His 2022 album Crash won the Juno Award for Francophone Album of the Year at the Juno Awards of 2023.

References

Canadian indie pop groups
Musical groups from Quebec
Juno Award for Francophone Album of the Year winners